Seyyed Kola (also Romanized as Seyyed Kolā; also known as Şeyd Kolā) is a village in Hasan Reza Rural District, in the Central District of Juybar County, Mazandaran Province, Iran. At the 2006 census, its population was 311, in 83 families.

References 

Populated places in Juybar County